John Stephenson (31 January 1896 – 1976) was an English footballer who played as a full back for Luton Town, Durham City, Rochdale, and Ashington.

Stephenson played in 204 professional matches throughout his career, scoring one goal from a penalty for Ashington against Tranmere Rovers.

References

Luton Town F.C. players
Rochdale A.F.C. players
Durham City A.F.C. players
Ashington A.F.C. players
Horden Athletic F.C. players
Gateshead A.F.C. players
Kettering Town F.C. players
Sportspeople from Durham, England
Footballers from County Durham
English footballers
Association football fullbacks
1896 births
1976 deaths